Where'd You Go, Bernadette is a 2012 epistolary comedy novel written by Maria Semple. The plot revolves around an agoraphobic architect and mother named Bernadette Fox, who goes missing prior to a family trip to Antarctica. It is narrated by her 15-year-old daughter Bee Branch, and is told in a series of documents (emails, memos, transcripts, etc.) with the occasional interlude by Bee.

Synopsis 
After her mother, Bernadette, goes missing, 16-year-old Bee Branch gathers correspondence relating to her mother in order to ascertain what has happened to her.

Bee's parents had previously promised her anything she wanted in exchange for good grades - upon presenting them with a perfect report card, she requests a family vacation to Antarctica. Bee’s father, Elgin, is a genius who works at Microsoft, while Bernadette is an agoraphobic stay-at-home parent who delegates the task of making their arrangements to a personal assistant in India, Manjula. Bernadette also has ongoing feuds with some of the other mothers at Bee's private school, the main instigator being her neighbor Audrey Griffin. Their tension worsens when Audrey accuses Bernadette of running over her foot with her car - which Bernadette does not dispute, though it is untrue - and when the hillside above Audrey’s house, recently cleared of blackberries by Bernadette at Audrey’s request, collapses during a rainstorm and slides into Audrey’s house.

Bee learns that her mother was once a famous architect who earned a MacArthur "Genius" Grant after creating the 20 Mile House in Los Angeles, so called because it was made entirely from materials sourced from within 20 miles of the home. After winning the grant, Bernadette sold the house, only to realize it had been sold to a hostile neighbor who demolished the home as soon as he obtained it. This caused Bernadette to lose her creative passion and prompted her relocation to Seattle, where she had four miscarriages before giving birth to Bee.

Soo-Lin Lee-Segal, a friend of Audrey’s and an admin at Microsoft, goes to work for Elgin. After she informs him of Bernadette's "attacks" on Audrey, he begins to consider admitting Bernadette to a psychiatric institution. As Soo-Lin and Elgin begin an emotional affair, the FBI contact Elgin to reveal that "Manjula" is a front for a Russian crime organization who plan to defraud Elgin and Bernadette. Elgin stages an intervention at their home with the FBI and police present, in the midst of which Bernadette excuses herself to go to the bathroom, but does not return.

Bee has been admitted to Choate Rosemary Hall, and is sent there early after Bernadette disappears. Soo-Lin reveals to Audrey that she is pregnant with Elgin's child as a result of a drunken one-night stand which Elgin regrets, and that he has bought them a family home. She also confesses that her life is miserable. Elgin and Soo-Lin learn that Bernadette went to Antarctica by herself, and go there to confront her only for her to disappear again.

At Choate, Bee receives a package containing the bulk of the correspondence used in the novel up to that point. It is revealed that after discovering that the accusations she levelled against Bernadette were going to result in her being hospitalized, a guilt-ridden Audrey helped her escape from home, showed her all the correspondence between Soo-Lin and Elgin, and sent the package to Bee in the hopes that she would then understand what happened to Bernadette.

Bee is kicked out of Choate, in part because of the manuscript she is putting together. She convinces her father to go to Antarctica with her under the guise of receiving closure, though she secretly believes her mother is hiding there. After nearly giving up hope, Bee learns of Palmer Station, an American base where scientists work and research. Bee steals a boat with her father and goes to the station where they in fact find Bernadette.

Upon returning home, Bee finds a letter sent to her by Bernadette while she was at Choate, where Bernadette states that she went to Antarctica in the hopes of reconciling with her husband and daughter, and decided to stay for the cruise. While there, she met a scientist who told her about Palmer Station and an architectural project for the South Pole in which every single material would have to be shipped from the U.S. which meant that it was of the utmost importance for everything to be designed to complete perfection. Bernadette snuck on board Palmer Station hoping to work on the project and sent the letter to Bee asking for her blessing and telling her she would return home if she did not get it within a set period of time.

Bestseller lists 
 A year on the New York Times Bestseller List
 72 weeks on  NPR Paperback Fiction Bestseller List
 12 weeks on  NPR Hardcover Fiction Bestseller List

Awards
 Shortlisted for the 2013 Women's Prize for Fiction
 Alex Award 2013, American Library Association

Audiobook 
An audiobook version was released in 2012 by Hachette Audio, read by narrator Kathleen Wilhoite.

Film adaptation 

Annapurna Pictures and Color Force acquired the rights to the film adaptation of the novel in January 2013. Scott Neustadter and Michael H. Weber were initially set to write the screenplay. Maria Semple and Ted Schipper executive produced. Richard Linklater directed the film, and Cate Blanchett starred. Linklater, Holly Gent, and Vince Palmo are credited for the finished script. Kristen Wiig, Billy Crudup, Laurence Fishburne, Troian Bellisario and Judy Greer co-starred. Production began in July 2017. The film was released in August 2019.

References

External links
Review of Where'd You Go Bernadette Janet Maslin, New York Times, August 6, 2012.

2012 American novels
Agoraphobia in fiction
American novels adapted into films
English-language novels
Epistolary novels
Little, Brown and Company books